Portunus brockii is a swimmer crab that is usually found in sandy mud from Japan to eastern Indian Ocean including China, Singapore, Philippines, Indonesia and Australia .

References

External links

Portunoidea
Edible crustaceans
Commercial crustaceans
Crustaceans described in 1887
Taxa named by Johannes Govertus de Man